Larry Lovette Brown (born September 1, 1976) is a former American football tight end who played for the Tennessee Titans of the National Football League (NFL). He played college football at University of Georgia.

References 

1976 births
Living people
People from Decatur, Georgia
Sportspeople from DeKalb County, Georgia
American football tight ends
Georgia Bulldogs football players
Tennessee Titans players